Almere Centrum is a railway station in Almere, Netherlands. It is located approximately 22 kilometres east of Amsterdam. The station lies on the Weesp–Lelystad railway. Almere Centrum is located in central Almere: a new town established in 1976 on land reclaimed from the sea (cf. Flevoland). Almere Centrum has two platforms and four tracks, and was opened in 1987 following the completion of the Flevolijn between Weesp railway station and Lelystad Centrum. The station's original name was Almere Central Station (CS), but it was renamed in 1999 to Almere Centrum.

The station building has a glass roof, and the tracks and platforms are elevated above street level. Almere Centrum bus station is located beneath the railway station.

Train services

Bus services
These services are operated by Keolis Nederland.

M1 Almere Centrum - Stedenwijk - 't Oor Bus Station - Almere Haven
M2 Almere Centrum - Waterwijk -  Bouwmeesterbuurt - Molenbuurt - Station Buiten- Seizoenenbuurt - Oostvaarders - Striphelden
M3 Almere Centrum - Kruidenwijk - Muziekwijk
M4 Almere Centrum - Stedenwijk - Muziekwijk - Literatuurwijk - Homeruskwartier - Almere Poort
M5 Almere Centrum - Filmwijk - Danswijk - Parkwijk - Verzetswijk - Tussen de Vaarten
M6 Almere Centrum - Kruidenwijk - Noorderplassen
326 Almere Centrum - Stedenwijk - 't Oor Bus Station - Almere Hout - Blaricum

These services are operated by OV Regio IJsselmond.
159 Almere Centrum - Filmwijk - Zeewolde - Harderwijk
160 Almere Centrum - Stedenwijk - 't Oor Bus Station - Zeewolde

This service is operated by Flixbus.
 Almere Centrum - Vianen - Kaatsheuvel (Efteling) - Tilburg - Brussels

Night buses

Gallery

References

External links

Information about the station.
NS website
Dutch Public Transport journey planner

Centrum
Railway stations opened in 1987
Railway stations on the Flevolijn